Bruno Wu Zheng (born 1966) is a Chinese entrepreneur.

In 2016, Forbes estimated his family's fortune around $1 billion.

Education
Wu studied at the University of Savoy, Chambéry, France. He returned to China, worked on a hotel project, and moved to the US to study starting in August 1989 at the Culver–Stockton College, Missouri, where he earned a bachelor's degree in business management in 1990, and in 1993, a master's degree in international relations from Washington University in St. Louis, US.

In 2001, Wu earned a PhD from the School of International Relations and Public Affairs, Fudan University, China.

Career
Wu was the chairman of Sun Media Group (1999-2007), and a director of Shanda Group (2006-2009). Wu was co-chairman of Sina from 2001 to 2002. He was chief operating officer for Asia Television from 1998 to 1999.

References

1966 births
Living people
Businesspeople from Shanghai
Billionaires from Shanghai
Chinese mass media owners
Fudan University alumni
Chinese chief operating officers
Culver–Stockton College alumni
Washington University in St. Louis alumni
Université Savoie-Mont Blanc alumni
Chinese company founders
Chinese expatriates in the United States